The Collected Short Stories of Aldous Huxley (1957) consists of twenty stories compiled from five of Huxley's earlier collections and one from his novel Crome Yellow. It was published by Harper & Row in the US and Chatto & Windus in the UK.

Limbo (1920):
"Happily Ever After"
"Eupompus Gave Splendour to Art by Numbers"
"Cynthia"
"The Bookshop"
"The Death of Lully"

Crome Yellow (1921):
"Sir Hercules"

Mortal Coils (1922):
"The Gioconda Smile"
"The Tillotson Banquet"
"Green Tunnels"
"Nuns at Luncheon"

Little Mexican (1924):
"Little Mexican"
"Hubert and Minnie"
"Fard"
"The Portrait"
"Young Archimedes"

Two or Three Graces (1926):
"Half Holiday"
"The Monocle"
"Fairy Godmother"

Brief Candles (1930):
"Chawdron"
"The Rest Cure"
"The Claxtons"

1957 short story collections
Short story collections by Aldous Huxley
Chatto & Windus books
Harper & Row books